First-seeded Shirley Fry defeated Althea Gibson 6–3, 6–4 in the final to win the women's singles tennis title at the 1957 Australian Championships and completed the career Grand Slam in singles.

Seeds
The seeded players are listed below. Shirley Fry is the champion; others show the round in which they were eliminated.

 Shirley Fry (champion)
 Althea Gibson (finalist)
 Mary Carter (quarterfinals)
 Beryl Penrose (semifinals)
 Lorraine Coghlan (semifinals)
 Jenny Hoad (quarterfinals)
 Margaret Hellyer (second round)
 Fay Muller (second round)

Draw

Key
 Q = Qualifier
 WC = Wild card
 LL = Lucky loser
 r = Retired

Finals

Earlier rounds

Section 1

Section 2

External links
 

1957 in women's tennis
1957
1957 in Australian tennis
1957 in Australian women's sport